The Sault Plat River is a river flowing in Rivière-au-Tonnerre, in Minganie Regional County Municipality, in the administrative region of Côte-Nord, in the province of Quebec, Canada. It empties into the Gulf of Saint Lawrence.

The river is known for the dramatic evidence of glacial action, which has created large ridges and grooves in the bedrock.
A section of the river cascading over these flutes is visible from Quebec Route 138.

Location

This lake between the mountains is fed in particular by nine discharges of lakes or streams. In particular, it receives the waters of Grace and Boutereau lakes.

The mouth of Lac Delaunay is located at:
  north-east of downtown Sept-Îles;
  north of the mouth of the Sault Plat river;
  south-west of the center of the village of Rivière-au-Tonnerre.

  towards the south, in particular by crossing Lac Plat, up to a bend river corresponding to the discharge of a set of lakes (coming from the north-west);
  south (slightly east on the first half of the segment), collecting three streams on the east side, descending the mountain in the last  to go under the route 138 bridge at the end of the segment, up to its mouth.

The mouth of the river is in the municipality of Rivière-au-Tonnerre in Minganie Regional County Municipality.

In addition, 7.9% of the basin is in the unorganized territory of Rivière-Nipissis in the Sept-Rivières Regional County Municipality. 
The remainder is in the Minganie Regional County Municipality, divided between the unorganized territory of Lac-Jérôme (67.5%) and the municipality of Rivière-au-Tonnerre (24.6%).
It is to the west of the Tortue River watershed and to the east of the Bouleau River watershed.

Name

The river was not named on the maps by Gustave Rinfret (1913) or Edgar Rochette (1927).
The name first appeared officially on a map in 1969 in the Répertoire géographique du Québec.

The toponym "rivière du Sault Plat" was made official on December 5, 1968 in the place name bank of the Commission de toponymie du Québec.

Terrain

The piedmont region has rounded rocky hills, the highest being  in elevation.
On the coastal plain the post-glacial Goldthwait Sea left deep marine clay and silt sediments, later covered by deltaic sandy sediments.

A series of huge glacial flutes on the Sault Plat river bed near its mouth are visible from Quebec Route 138.
The Quebec government has designated this section of the river as an exceptional geological site (Site géologique exceptionnel).
The river cascades through the large flutes and troughs dug out by glaciers during the last ice age, about 18,000 years ago.
As the climate warmed the ice gradually withdrew to central Quebec, where it completely disappeared about 6,500 years ago.
The flutes and grooves are elongated in the direction of the ice flow.

Hydrology

The streams in the Sault Plat basin follow angular courses with straight stretches and sharp bends dictated by fractures in the bedrock.
In the widest valleys the streams sometimes meander.

Lake Delauney, in the center of the watershed, is in an old U-shaped glacial valley.
Both are irregular in shape.
In total, water bodies cover 12.2% of the basin's area.
Wetlands, mainly ombrotrophic bog on the coastal plain, cover 1.63% of the area.

Environment

A map of the ecological regions of Quebec shows the river in sub-regions 6j-T and 6m-T of the east spruce/moss subdomain.
Forest cover consists of black spruce (Picea mariana) and balsam fir (Abies balsamea), with black spruce dominant on the coastal plain and mixed spruce/fir in the piedmont region.
The only recorded fish species is brook trout (Salvelinus fontinalis).
Waterfowl congregate on the banks of the south of the river.
Reported species at the river mouth by a visitor in August 2019 included double-crested cormorant (Phalacrocorax auritus), northern gannet (Morus bassanus) and various gulls and ducks.

Notes

Sources

 

Rivers of Côte-Nord
Minganie Regional County Municipality